Jelly's Last Jam is a musical with a book by George C. Wolfe, lyrics by Susan Birkenhead, and music by Jelly Roll Morton and Luther Henderson.  Based on the life and career of Ferdinand Joseph LaMothe, known as Jelly Roll Morton and generally regarded as one of the primary driving forces behind the introduction of jazz to the American public in the early 20th century, it also serves as a social commentary on the African-American experience during the era. LaMothe was born into a Louisiana Creole family that was established and free before the Civil War.

Plot
The play opens with the recently deceased Morton in a state of limbo, looking back on his life.  He is reluctantly guided by the mysterious 'Chimney Man,' who forces him to recall the more painful moments of his life when he attempts to ignore or embellish them.  Born into an old and wealthy mixed-race Creole family in New Orleans, the young Morton rebels against his upbringing by going into the streets and absorbing the rhythms of the vendors and poor blacks, meeting blues musician Buddy Bolden.  When his Creole grandmother discovers his new lifestyle, she disowns him.

Forced to go on the road, Morton becomes a prominent composer and musician, and the self-proclaimed creator of jazz.  His sadness over his family's rejection causes him to stress his Creole ancestry and claim that there are 'no black notes in my song.' Eventually his pride and racism cause him to betray his best friend and the woman he loves.  In his later years, as the Jazz culture continues to grow, Morton is largely forgotten and reduced to dealing with crooked music publishers and gangsters, eventually dying of a knife wound in the colored wing of a Los Angeles hospital.  At the moment of his death, Morton at last admits to his heritage - "Ain't no black notes in my song/I was wrong/ I was wrong."  At this moment, the shadows of the people in his life surround him to congratulate him, and Morton takes his place in history among the other Jazz legends.

Production
Jelly's Last Jam premiered at the Mark Taper Forum, Los Angeles, California, in March 1991. Directed by Wolfe, Obba Babatunde played Jelly Roll. 
 
The Broadway production opened at the Virginia Theatre on April 26, 1992 and closed on September 5, 1993 after 569 performances and 25 previews. The musical was directed by Wolfe, choreographed by Hope Clarke, with tap choreography by Gregory Hines and Ted L. Levy, scenic design by Robin Wagner, costume design by Toni-Leslie James, and lighting design by Jules Fisher.

In addition to Gregory Hines and Savion Glover as the older and younger Morton, the cast included Ken Ard, Ruben Santiago-Hudson, Ann Duquesnay, Tonya Pinkins, Mary Bond Davis, and Keith David. Phylicia Rashad, Brian Stokes Mitchell and Ben Vereen joined the cast later in the run.

An original cast recording was released by Decca Broadway.

Song list

Act I      
 "Prologue" - The Chimney Man
 "Jelly's Jam" - The Hunnies, Crowd
 "In My Day" - Jelly, The Hunnies
 "The Creole Way" - Young Jelly, Amede, Viola, Ancestors
 "The Whole World's Waitin' to Sing Your Song" - Jelly, Young Jelly, Street Crowd
 "Michigan Water" - Miss Mamie, Buddy 
 "The Banishment" - Gran Mimi, Young Jelly, Jelly
 "Somethin' More" - Jelly, Jack, The Chimney Man, The Hunnies, Dancers
 "That's How You Jazz" - Jelly, Jack, Dancers
 "The Chicago Strut" - Jelly, The Chimney Man, The Hunnies, The Red Hot Peppers, Chicago Crowd
 "Play the Music for Me" - Anita
 "Lovin' Is a Lowdown Blues" - The Hunnies
 "Doctor Jazz - Jelly, Crowd

Act II      
 "Good Ole New York" - The Chimney Man, The Hunnies, New York Crowd
 "Too Late, Daddy" - Jelly, Harlem Crowd
 "That's the Way We Do Things in New York" - Jelly, The Melrose Brothers
 "Jelly's Isolation Dance" - Jelly
 "The Last Chance Blues" - Jelly, Anita
 "Creole Boy" - Jelly
 "We Are The Rhythms That Colour Your Song" - Company

Awards and nominations

Original Broadway production

Reception
John Lahr wrote the introduction to the printed script of Jelly's Last Jam, and noted that the musical "reclaims the gorgeous power of tap dancing as part of musical story telling".

References

External links
Internet Broadway Database listing
New York Times review

1992 musicals
All-Black cast Broadway shows
Biographical musicals
Broadway musicals
Cultural depictions of jazz musicians
Plays by George C. Wolfe
Plays set in the 20th century
Plays set in Los Angeles
Plays set in New Orleans
Plays set in the United States
Tony Award-winning musicals